So This is Great Britain? is the debut album from The Holloways, released 30 October 2006 on the back of the band's first two singles, "Two Left Feet" and "Generator", which appear on the album. They also released "Dancefloor" as a single.

The album was re-released on 1 October 2007 with slightly altered art work and a second disc of B-sides.

The album has received positive reviews.

Track listing

Personnel
Nathaniel Chan - Assistant, Digital Editing
Ben Cook	- Cover Photo, Sleeve Photo
Dario Dendi - Assistant, Digital Editing
Simon Hale - Keyboards
Jenny Hardcore - Sleeve Photo
Alfie Jackson - Vocals, Guitar, Composer
Leonard B. Johnson	 - A&R
Clive Langer - Mixing, Producer
Cesar Gimeno Lavin	 - Assistant, Digital Editing
Joshua Mascolo - Cover Star
Daniel Mead - Cover Design
Gregory Nolan	- Sleeve Photo
Markell Riley - Assistant, Digital Editing
Rob Skipper - Fiddle, Guitar, Sleeve Photo, Vocals
Julian Willmott	- Assistant, Digital Editing
Alan Winstanley - Engineer, Mixing, Producer

External links
 Review at Drowned in Sound
 So This is Great Britain? Album Review at UKEvents.net

2006 debut albums
The Holloways albums
Albums produced by Clive Langer
Albums produced by Alan Winstanley